Andreas Frangeskou (born 26 July 1996) is a Cypriot professional football player who plays as a centre back for Omonia.

Career
He started his career with AC Omonia, making his first appearance for the senior squad during the 2016–17 season against AEL Limassol.

References

External links
https://web.archive.org/web/20170514104627/http://www.omonoia.com.cy/team.php?section=1&season=6&lang=GR
https://web.archive.org/web/20170624085840/http://www.cfa.com.cy/Gr/playerclubs/2600767/41001

Cypriot footballers
1996 births
Living people
Association football central defenders
AC Omonia players
Alki Larnaca FC players
Nea Salamis Famagusta FC players
PAEEK players